Forsén, a Swedish family name, in America Forsen. Notable people with the name include:

Harold K. Forsen (1932–2012), American physicist
John Forsen, American film producer and director 
Lena Forsén, Swedish Playboy Playmate model and subject in the standard test image Lenna

See also 

 Forsen (disambiguation)